Aslanapa is a town and district of Kütahya Province in the Aegean region of Turkey.

References

External links

 District governor's official website 

Populated places in Kütahya Province
Districts of Kütahya Province